Rear Admiral Anura Ekanayake RSP, USP, psc, MMaritimePol, is a retired Sri Lankan Naval officer. He served as Deputy chief of staff at Sri Lanka Navy. Prior to that, he served as Director General of the Sri Lanka Coast Guard (SLCG).

Early life 
Ekanayake studied at Dharmaraja College, Kandy. He joined Sri Lanka Navy as an Officer Cadet in 1987 for the 16th Intake in the executive branch of the Sri Lanka Navy.

Career 
He served as Second in Command of Southeastern Naval Area when he was Commodore. He served as Director of Project and Planning at Naval Headquarters. Then, he served as the 6th Director General of Sri Lanka Coast Guard. He assumed the position of Deputy Chief of Staff on 9 July 2022. After served 3 months, he retired from active service on 12 October 2022.

Personal life 
He married Sandya Ekanayake and the couple raised 3 daughters.

References 

Sri Lankan rear admirals
1968 births
Living people
Naval and Maritime Academy graduates
Sinhalese military personnel